David Grant Colson (April 1, 1861 – September 27, 1904) was an American politician from the State of Kentucky who served as a U.S. Representative from Kentucky's 11th congressional district. He previously served in the Kentucky House of Representatives and as the mayor of Middlesboro.

Biography
Colson was born in Yellow Creek (now Middlesboro, Kentucky), Knox (now Bell) County, Kentucky. He was the seventh of eleven children. Colson attended the common schools and the academies at Tazewell and Mossy Creek, Tennessee.

He studied law at the University of Kentucky at Lexington in 1879 and 1880. He was admitted to the bar and commenced practice in Pineville.

Political career
Colson, a Republican, served as a state representative in 1887 and 1888, representing Bell, Harlan, Perry, and Leslie Counties, and again in 1902. He was the Republican nominee for State Treasurer in 1889. He served as mayor of Middlesboro in 1893-1895.

Colson was elected a US Representative in 1894 and re-elected in 1896, serving in the Fifty-fourth and Fifty-fifth Congresses (March 4, 1895 – March 3, 1899). He served as chairman of the Committee on Expenditures on Public Buildings in the Fifty-fifth Congress. During his second term in Congress, Colson was known as a supporter of President McKinley's administration, but often voted with Democrats on regional issues.

While a Representative, Colson was a member of the "Free Cuba" group. In 1898, during the Spanish–American War, Colson left his position in Congress to become colonel of the Fourth Kentucky Volunteer Infantry. After his military service, he did not run for re-election.

In 1899, Colson was shot in the arm by a fellow officer, Lieutenant Ethelbert Dudley Scott. Colson had previously brought court-martial charges against Scott.  On January 16, 1900, Colson got in a pistol fight with Scott in a hotel lobby in Frankfort, Kentucky. Three men were killed: Scott and two bystanders, Charles Julian and Luther Demaree. Colson was acquitted of the charges that April.

Colson died at his farm outside of Middlesboro, Kentucky on September 27, 1904.
He was interred in Colson Cemetery.

See also

 Colson–Scott Tragedy

References

1861 births
1904 deaths
American military personnel of the Spanish–American War
Kentucky lawyers
Mayors of places in Kentucky
Republican Party members of the Kentucky House of Representatives
People from Bell County, Kentucky
United States Department of the Interior officials
University of Kentucky alumni
Republican Party members of the United States House of Representatives from Kentucky
19th-century American politicians